Hein Olaf Heinsen (born July 23, 1935 in Grindsted, Denmark) is a Danish artist who has contributed to the Lutheran art of Scandinavia. He made his debut on the Danish art scene in the 1960s as part of the minimalistic movement. Heinsen served as a Professor at The Royal Danish Academy of Fine Arts from 1980 to 1989. Heinsen has primarily been working with bronze sculptures and large installation projects since the mid-1980s.  He is currently working as a consultant for the TRINITY MACHINE project.

References

Danish Wikipedia article
TRINITY MACHINE

1935 births
Living people
People from Billund Municipality
Minimalist artists
Danish sculptors
Modern sculptors
Academic staff of the Royal Danish Academy of Fine Arts
Recipients of the Thorvaldsen Medal
Recipients of the Eckersberg Medal